The following are the national records in athletics in Ghana maintained by Ghana's national athletics federation: Ghana Athletics Association (GAA).

Outdoor

Key to tables:

h = hand timing

* = doubtful distance

A = affected by altitude

NWI = no wind information

OT = oversized track (> 200m in circumference)

y = denotes one mile

Men

Women

Indoor

Men

Women

References
General
World Athletics Statistic Handbook 2019: National Outdoor Records
World Athletics Statistic Handbook 2018: National Indoor Records
Specific

External links

National records in athletics (track and field)
Athletics records
 Records